Katalyst may refer to:

 Katalyst (musician), Australian DJ and producer
 Katalyst Media, a television  production company founded by Ashton Kutcher and Jason Goldberg